Paetz is a surname. Notable people with the surname include:

David Paetz (born 1940), New Zealand cricketer
Juliusz Paetz (1935–2019), Polish bishop of the Catholic Church
Rolf Paetz (1922–1994), German footballer
Sabine Paetz (née Möbius, second married name John, born 1957), East German heptathlete

See also 
Patz